Henry "Razzo" Carroll (July 12, 1909 – January 14, 1999) was a U.S. soccer forward who played in both the first and second American Soccer Leagues.  He led the league in scoring in 1934.  He also earned two caps, scoring one goal, with the U.S. national team in 1928.

Carroll began his club career with the Bayonne Rovers S.C. in the late 1920s.  He was selected for the U.S. team at the 1928 Summer Olympics.   On May 20, 1928, the U.S. lost by a score of 11-2 to Argentina in the first round.  Carroll scored the second of the two U.S. goals.  As the tournament was single elimination, the U.S. now had free time so they traveled to Warsaw where they tied Poland 3-3, Carroll playing in that game.

In 1929, Carroll signed with the Brooklyn Wanderers in the American Soccer League.  However, he did not break into the first team until the 1930 fall season when he scored five goals in six games. He played another eight games in the 1931 spring season after which the Wanderers withdrew from the league and ceased operations. He later moved to the Kearny Scots of the American Soccer League.  In 1934, he tied Archie Stark as the ASL goal scoring leader.  In 1939, he was listed with Brookhattan.  He also played for the Philadelphia Americans, winning the 1942 ASL title with the Americans, and Brooklyn Hispano.

Henry had Irish ancestry as his mother Mary Dowling came from Listowel, Co Kerry, Ireland.

References

1909 births
1999 deaths
American soccer players
Footballers at the 1928 Summer Olympics
Olympic soccer players of the United States
United States men's international soccer players
American Soccer League (1921–1933) players
American Soccer League (1933–1983) players
Brooklyn Hispano players
Kearny Scots players
New York Brookhattan players
Uhrik Truckers players
Association football forwards